John Jervis may refer to:

John Jervis, 1st Earl of St Vincent (1735–1823), Royal Navy admiral
Sir John Jervis (judge) (1802–1856), British politician, Solicitor General, Attorney General and Privy Counsellor
John Jervis (MP for Horsham) (1826-?), British MP for Horsham
John B. Jervis (1795–1885), American civil engineer

See also
John Jarvis (disambiguation)